Delevea namibensis is a species of beetles in the genus Delevea.

References

Myxophaga
Beetles described in 1997